is a passenger railway station in the town of Higashiagatsuma, Gunma Prefecture, Japan, operated by East Japan Railway Company (JR East).

Lines
Gōbara Station is a station on the Agatsuma Line, and is located 26.3 rail kilometers from the terminus of the line at Shibukawa Station.

Station layout
The station consists of two opposed side platforms connected by a level crossing. The station is unattended.

Platforms

History
Gōbara Station was opened on 20 April 1946. The station was absorbed into the JR East network upon the privatization of the Japanese National Railways (JNR) on 1 April 1987.

Surrounding area
 site of Iwabitsu Castle

See also
 List of railway stations in Japan

External links

 JR East Station information 

Railway stations in Gunma Prefecture
Agatsuma Line
Stations of East Japan Railway Company
Railway stations in Japan opened in 1946
Higashiagatsuma, Gunma